Mahmoody is an Arabic surname that may refer to

Betty Mahmoody (born 1945), American author and public speaker 
Mahtob Mahmoody (born 1979), American author, daughter of Betty and Sayyed
Sayyed Bozorg Mahmoody (c.1939–2009), Iranian anesthesiologist, husband of Betty

Arabic-language surnames